The 1974 NFL season was the 55th regular season of the National Football League. The season ended with Super Bowl IX when the Pittsburgh Steelers defeated the Minnesota Vikings. Players held a strike from July 1 until August 10, prior to the regular season beginning; only one preseason game (that year's College All-Star Game) was canceled, and the preseason contests were held with all-rookie rosters.

Draft
The 1974 NFL Draft was held from January 29 to 30, 1974 at New York City's Americana Hotel. With the first pick, the Dallas Cowboys selected defensive end Ed "Too Tall" Jones from the Tennessee State University.

New officials
There were two new referees in 1974, Cal Lepore and Gordon McCarter. Lepore replaced the retired John McDonough, the referee for Super Bowl IV and the NFL's longest game, the 1971 Christmas Day playoff between the Dolphins and Chiefs which lasted 82 minutes, 40 seconds. McCarter succeeded Jack Reader, who left the field to become chief lieutenant to NFL Director of Officiating Art McNally at league headquarters in New York.

Major rule changes
The following changes were adopted to add tempo and action to the game  and to help counter the proposed changes announced by the World Football League to their games:
One sudden death overtime period (originally 15 minutes; since , 10 minutes) was added to all preseason (up to ) and regular season games; if no team scored in this period, the game would result in a tie. This rule was enacted to decrease the number of tie games. The first regular season overtime, a September 22 game between the Pittsburgh Steelers and the Denver Broncos, ended in a 35–all draw. It was not until November 10, when the New York Jets defeated the New York Giants, 26–20, that an overtime game would produce a winner. Since the  season teams each get one possession to score unless the team first possessing the ball scores a touchdown or yields safety.
Goal posts: moved to the end line from the goal line, where they were since . This was to reduce the number of games being decided on field goals, and to increase their difficulty, as well as to reduce the risk of player injuries. They were last placed there from  through .
Missed field goals: the defensive team takes possession at the line of scrimmage or the twenty-yard line (touchback), whichever is farther from their goal line. (In , that reference to the line of scrimmage was changed to the kick spot, which is seven to eight yards behind the line of scrimmage.)
Kickoffs: moved to the 35-yard line (from the forty-yard line) to reduce touchbacks, promoting more excitement with kickoff returns, through  and since . From  through , the kickoff was five yards back, at the thirty-yard line.
Punt returns: members of the kicking team cannot go beyond the line of scrimmage until the ball is kicked, except the player at the farthest end of each side of the snapper ("gunners"). The original rule change would have prohibited any player from crossing the line of scrimmage prior to the ball being kicked.  The penalty is the same as that for an ineligible player downfield on a pass play.
An eligible pass receiver could only be contacted once by defenders after the receiver has gone three yards beyond the line of scrimmage.
When the defensive team commits an illegal use of hands, arms, or body foul from behind the line of scrimmage, the penalty will be assessed from the previous spot instead of the spot of the foul.
The penalties for offensive holding, illegal use of hands, and tripping were reduced from fifteen to ten yards.
Wide receivers blocking back towards the ball within three yards from the line of scrimmage may not block below the waist.

In addition to the on-field rule changes, the league eliminated the "future list" of players a team could sign without placing them on an active roster.

Division races
From 1970 to 2001, there were three divisions (Eastern, Central and Western) in each conference.  The winners of each division, and a fourth “wild card” team based on the best non-division winner, qualified for the playoffs.  The tiebreaker rules were changed to start with head-to-head competition, followed by division records, records against common opponents, and records in conference play.

National Football Conference

American Football Conference

Final standings

Tiebreakers
N.Y. Jets finished ahead of New England in the AFC East based on better conference record (5–6 to Patriots’ 4–7).
Houston finished ahead of Cincinnati in the AFC Central based on head-to-head sweep (2–0).
Kansas City finished ahead of San Diego in the AFC West based on better point-differential in head-to-head competition (3 points).
St. Louis finished ahead of Washington in the NFC East based on head-to-head sweep (2–0).

Playoffs

Awards

Coaching changes

Offseason
Detroit Lions: Don McCafferty died on July 28, 1974, after suffering a heart attack. Assistant coach Rick Forzano was promoted to head coach and remained in the position for two and a half seasons. 
Houston Oilers: This was Sid Gillman's first full season as head coach after replacing Bill Peterson, who was fired after the Oilers lost their first five games in 1973.
New York Giants: Alex Webster was replaced by Bill Arnsparger, architect of the Miami Dolphins' "No-Name Defense". 
New York Jets: After 11 seasons as head coach, Weeb Ewbank resigned and was replaced by Charley Winner, Ewbank's son-in-law and head coach of the Cardinals from 1966-70.
San Diego Chargers: Tommy Prothro became the team's new head coach. Harland Svare left the team midway through the 1973 season after going 1–6–1, and Ron Waller served for the last six games.

In-season
Atlanta Falcons: Norm Van Brocklin was fired after starting the season at 2–6. Defensive coordinator Marion Campbell served as head coach for the remainder of the season. He was elevated to full-time head coach for 1975, but fired midway through the 1976 season; Campbell returned to the Falcons from 1987-89 after three seasons as head coach of the Philadelphia Eagles.
Baltimore Colts: Howard Schnellenberger was fired after three games into the season. General Manager Joe Thomas served as head coach for the remainder of the season.

Uniform changes
 The Buffalo Bills replaced their standing red bison helmet logo with a charging blue one with a red slanting stripe coming from its horns.
 The Dallas Cowboys moved the TV numbers on their white jerseys from the sleeves to the shoulders, where they had been from 1964-69. TV numbers on the blue jerseys remained on the sleeves until 1979. 
 The Kansas City Chiefs switched from gray to white face masks. The arrowhead logo on the helmets shrank in size, while the black border on the arrowhead became thicker. 
 The Miami Dolphins modified its helmet logo so that the sunburst was centered on the dolphin's body instead of its head. Several players wore this logo during the 1973 playoffs and Super Bowl VIII. 
 The Philadelphia Eagles switched from white to green helmets, and added sleeve stripes and trim to the numbers. Pants changed from white to silver.
 The San Diego Chargers introduced new uniforms, changing their primary color from sky powder blue to royal blue. The helmets were also changed from white to royal blue, and the players' numbers on its sides were removed. In addition, the face masks were switched from gray to yellow.
 The Chiefs and Chargers were the first NFL teams to wear face masks in a color other than gray.

Television
ABC, CBS, and NBC each signed four-year contracts to renew their rights to broadcast Monday Night Football, the NFC package, and the AFC package, respectively. The major change was that ABC was also given the rights to the Pro Bowl, instead of having the game rotate annually between CBS and NBC.

Don Meredith left ABC to join NBC's lead broadcast team of Curt Gowdy and Al DeRogatis in their own three-man booth. NBC also hired the then-recently retired quarterback John Brodie to replace Kyle Rote as the network's #2 color commentator, alongside Jim Simpson. ABC initially hired Fred Williamson to replace Meredith in the MNF booth, but he was so inarticulate during the preseason broadcasts that Williamson was replaced by Alex Karras for the regular season.

CBS abandoned its pre-recorded The NFL Today pregame show in favor of a live, wraparound style program titled The NFL on CBS. Jack Buck was originally promoted to replace Ray Scott as the network's lead play-by-play announcer alongside color commentator Pat Summerall; only for CBS to shift Summerall from color commentator to play-by-play at midseason. Tom Brookshier was then paired with Summerall.

References

 NFL Record and Fact Book
 NFL History 1971–1980 (Last accessed December 4, 2005)
 Total Football: The Official Encyclopedia of the National Football League

 
1974